Francisc Balla (Hungarian: Ferenc Balló, born 22 October 1932) is a retired middleweight freestyle wrestler. He won silver medals at the 1965 and 1967 world and 1967 European championships. Ethnic Hungarian he competed for Romania at the 1964 and 1968 Olympics.

References

External links
 

1932 births
Living people
Olympic wrestlers of Romania
Wrestlers at the 1964 Summer Olympics
Wrestlers at the 1968 Summer Olympics
Romanian male sport wrestlers
Romanian sportspeople of Hungarian descent
European Wrestling Championships medalists
World Wrestling Championships medalists
20th-century Romanian people
21st-century Romanian people